The Telocvicna Jednota "T.J." Sokol Hall, also known as Crete Sokol Hall or SA01-176, is an historic building located in Crete, Nebraska that was built in 1915. It was listed on the National Register of Historic Places on November 26, 2003.  The building historically served as a host for Sokol gymnastic events and as a meeting hall for the Czech community.

See also 
 Sokol
 Telocvicna Jednota Sokol

References

External links 
 Crete T.J. Sokol

Czech-American culture in Nebraska
Buildings and structures in Saline County, Nebraska
Clubhouses on the National Register of Historic Places in Nebraska
Buildings and structures completed in 1915
Sokol in the United States
National Register of Historic Places in Saline County, Nebraska